Edmund Knox (1772 – 3 May 1849) was an absentee Irish bishop in the mid 19th century whose death at the height of the Irish Famine lead to a famously critical leading article in The Times.

He was born in 1772, the 7th and youngest son of Thomas Knox, 1st Viscount Northland and educated at Trinity College, Dublin. He was Dean of Down from 1817  to his elevation to the episcopate as Bishop of Killaloe and Kilfenora in 1831. Translated to become Bishop of Limerick, Ardfert and Aghadoe in 1834 he died in post on 3 May 1849.

References

1772 births
1849 deaths
Alumni of Trinity College Dublin
Deans of Down
Bishops of Killaloe and Kilfenora
Bishops of Limerick, Ardfert and Aghadoe
19th-century Anglican bishops in Ireland
Younger sons of viscounts